FS1 Flight Simulator is a 1979 video game published by Sublogic for the Apple II. A TRS-80 version followed in 1980. FS1 Flight Simulator is a flight simulator in the cockpit of a slightly modernized Sopwith Camel. FS1 is the first in a line of simulations from Sublogic which, beginning in 1982, were also sold by Microsoft as Microsoft Flight Simulator.

Sublogic later released updated versions for both the Apple II and TRS-80 on 5  inch diskettes. The updates include enhanced terrain, help menus, and a bomb sight.

Gameplay

Development
Computer-graphics specialist Bruce Artwick and pilot and marketing student Stu Moment were roommates at the University of Illinois. A2FS1 Flight Simulator, their first product after forming Sublogic, had black and white wireframe graphics, featured a very limited scenery consisting of 36 tiles (in a 6 by 6 pattern, which roughly equals a few hundred square kilometers), and provided a very basic simulation (with only one aircraft simulated).

Sublogic advertised that the $25 FS1 "is a visual flight simulator that gives you realistically stable aircraft control", with a graphics engine "capable of drawing 150 lines per second".

Ports
The simulator was later ported to the TRS-80 Model I, which had only rudimentary graphics capability. To squeeze the simulator into the TRS-80 limited memory and display, the instrument panel was dropped and the resolution of the cockpit window display reduced.

Reception
J. Mishcon reviewed FS1 Flight Simulator in The Space Gamer No. 31. Mishcon commented that "All things considered, this is single most impressive computer game I have seen. It creates a whole new standard. I most strongly urge you to buy it and see for yourself."

Bob Proctor reviewed the game for Computer Gaming World, and stated that "Although there are other flight simulators, the Sublogic program remains unique for the built-in dogfight game. While raving about the simulation, reviewers have called the game 'difficult', 'challenging', and 'next to impossible.'"

Flight Simulator sold 30,000 copies by June 1982, tied for third on Computer Gaming Worlds list of top sellers.

Reviews
SoftSide
80 Micro
Moves #56, p25

References

1979 video games
Apple II games
Computer-related introductions in 1979
Flight simulation video games
General flight simulators
TRS-80 games
Video games developed in the United States